A by-election was held for the South Australian House of Assembly seat of Custance on 23 June 1990. This was triggered by the resignation of former state Liberal leader and MHA John Olsen.

Results
The Liberals retained the seat after preferences.

See also
List of South Australian state by-elections

References

South Australian state by-elections
1990 elections in Australia
1990s in South Australia